Upper Mill or Walton Mill is a Grade II listed smock mill at Walton, Suffolk, England, which has been conserved.

History

Upper Mill was built  in 1804. The mill was dismantled in the early 20th century leaving the empty smock tower standing. The mill was on the Buildings at Risk Register in 1995 but repairs have since been carried out to the weatherboarding to ensure the mill's survival.

Description

Upper Mill is a two-storey smock mill on a two-storey brick base. It had four Patent sails and the boat-shaped cap was winded by a fantail. It had two pairs of millstones.

References

Windmills in Suffolk
Smock mills in England
Windmills completed in 1804
Grinding mills in the United Kingdom
Grade II listed buildings in Suffolk
Grade II listed windmills
Felixstowe
Octagonal buildings in the United Kingdom